Anisopodus varius is a species of beetle in the family Cerambycidae that was described by Melzer in 1935.

References

Anisopodus
Beetles described in 1935